Pension is a 2021 Indian Marathi-language film directed by Pundalilik Yoshada Laxman Dhumal and produced by Savi Goel.

Reception 

The Times of India said "Director Pundalik YL Dhumal's film is based on a soul-stirring premise. The story has its heart in the right place too. However, the final product lacks finesse. Daily life in the village, petty quarrels, peculiar people - too much time is spent exploring everything else than the crux of the matter. This hampers the flow and doesn't hold the viewer's attention for long".

Maharashtra Times praised the performances:

Cast
 Sumit Gutte as Balu
 Nilambari Khamkar as Grandmother
 Sonali Kulkarni as Vimal

Soundtrack

References

External links
 

2021 films
2021 drama films
Indian drama films